Lishui is a prefecture-level city in Zhejiang, China.
 Liandu District, formerly Lishui County and county-level city; district of Lishui, Zhejiang

Lishui may also refer to:

 Lishui River, a Yangtze tributary in Hunan
 Lishui District, Nanjing, Jiangsu
 Lishui station (Jiangsu) (zh), high-speed railway station on the Nanjing–Hangzhou high-speed railway
 Lishui station (Nanjing Metro) on Line S7 of the Nanjing Metro in Jiangsu
 Line S7 (Nanjing Metro), also known as the Lishui Line
 Lishui railway station (Zhejiang) (zh), station on the Jinhua–Wenzhou high-speed railway and conventional Jinhua–Wenzhou railway
 Lishui, Foshan, town in Nanhai, Foshan, Guangdong

See also
 Yeosu, South Korea, also written in Hanja as ""